Estadio Iberoamericano, formerly known as Estadio Bahía Sur, is a multi-sport stadium located in San Fernando, Province of Cádiz, Andalusia, Spain. It was inaugurated on November 22, 1992, with a soccer game between San Fernando CD and Montilla CF.

Property of the municipality, it is the home stadium of CD San Fernando.  It is equipped with both an artificial grass and natural grass surface.  Its capacity is 8,000 spectators.

The stadium was constructed as a replacement for CD San Fernando's previous field, Campo de Deportes Marqués de Varela, that it has become outdated.

It hosted the XIV Campeonato Iberoamericano de Atletismo in 2010, and underwent considerable refurbishment. This included the addition of a roof over the main stand, new seating and athletics track.

References

External links
Estadios de España 

Football venues in Andalusia
Buildings and structures in San Fernando, Cádiz
1992 establishments in Spain
Sports venues completed in 1992
Sport in San Fernando, Cádiz